Petra Kvitová was the two-time defending champion, but withdrew with an arm injury before the tournament began.

Ashleigh Barty won the title without dropping a set, defeating Julia Görges in the final 6–3, 7–5. As a result of winning the title, Barty attained the WTA no. 1 singles ranking for the first time, displacing Naomi Osaka at the No. 1 position.

The second round match between Karolína and Kristýna Plíšková was the first match between identical twins in WTA Tour history.

Seeds

Draw

Finals

Top half

Bottom half

Qualifying

Seeds

Qualifiers

Draw

First qualifier

Second qualifier

Third qualifier

Fourth qualifier

References

External links
 Main Draw
 Qualifying Draw

Birmingham Classic- Singles
Singles